Lee Albert Daniels (born April 15, 1942) is an American politician who served as a Republican member of the Illinois House of Representatives from 1975 until 2007 including two years as Speaker of the House.

Early life
Lee Daniels was born April 15, 1942 in Lansing, Michigan while his parents were university students. His grandfather was Lee E. Daniels, a Republican politician who served as the State's Attorney for DuPage County and as a member of the Illinois House of Representatives.

Daniels was raised in Elmhurst, Illinois. He is a graduate of the University of Iowa and earned a law degree from John Marshall Law School.

Daniels served for six and a half years on the York Township Board of Auditors.

Legal career
Daniels became authorized to practice law in November 1967. In 1971, William J. Scott appointed Daniels a Special Assistant Attorney General. Daniels would serve in the position until 1974. In his position with Scott's office, Daniels headed the investigation into and civil litigation against Equity Funding. He worked at the firm of Daniels & Faris from 1967 to 1982 and was an equity partner Katten Muchin & Zavis from 1982 to 1981. He retired in 2006 from the Chicago law firm of Bell Boyd & Lloyd, where he was an equity partner.

Illinois House of Representatives
Daniels was elected to the Illinois House of Representatives in the 1974 general election with Republican incumbent Gene L. Hoffman and Democratic incumbent William A. Redmond as one of three members from the 40th district. That same election, the Democratic Party won control of the Illinois House of Representatives. At the start of the 79th General Assembly, the Democratic caucus was fractured between various legislators for the position of Speaker of the Illinois House of Representatives. Over a week after the election for Speaker began; Daniels crossed party lines on the 89th ballot to vote for his fellow 40th district legislator William A. Redmond, now the Democratic compromise choice, against Democratic holdout Clyde Choate and Republican leader James R. Washburn. After Daniels vote, a weekend recess was called. On Monday, Daniels and a small group of Republicans, including Daniels, cast their votes for Redmond.

Daniels served as a member of the Illinois House of Representatives from 1975 to 2007. After the Cutback Amendment abolished multi-member districts and cumulative voting, Daniels ran against Democrat and fellow 40th district incumbent Bud Loftus. Daniels defeated Loftus in the heavily Republican 46th district. Daniels rose through the Republican ranks serving as the Majority Whip during the 82nd General Assembly before becoming the leader of the House Republican Caucus during the 83rd General Assembly. He served as the Republican leader from 1983 to 2003. He was Speaker of the House from 1995 to 1997. From 1989-1990 he was the President of the National Conference of State Legislatures.

Post-legislative career
Daniels serves as a member (2010–present) and chairman (2014-present) of the board of directors of Haymarket Center, a nonprofit drug and alcohol treatment center in Chicago. He recently served as chairman of the College of DuPage Presidential Search Committee (2015-2016). He previously served on the Elmhurst Memorial Healthcare board of trustees, Elmhurst Memorial Healthcare board of governors, and the Elmhurst Memorial Hospital Foundation board. Other boards Daniels has served on include Inland Diversified Real Estate Trust, Inc., the Suburban Bank and Trust Company of Elmhurst board of directors, Elmhurst Federal Savings and Loan Association board of directors, and the DuPage Easter Seals board of directors.

He has received numerous honors, including an honorary Doctorate of Law from Elmhurst College, where he serves as a distinguished fellow. In 2008 Elmhurst College renamed its Computer Science and Technology Center "Daniels Hall."

On September 27, 2011, Senate President John Cullerton appointed Daniels to a two-year term as a public member on the Illinois Advisory Council on Alcoholism and Other Drug Dependency. The sixty member council advises the executive branch on ways to encourage public understanding and support of department programs; proposed rules and licensure; and formulation and implementation of the comprehensive state plan for intervention, prevention, and treatment of alcoholism and other drug abuse and dependency.

Daniels is married to Pamela Daniels. They have 5 children and live in Elmhurst, Illinois.

External links
Illinois House of Representatives bio
Lee A Daniels & Associates, LLC
Academic Building Named for Lee Daniels
4th Annual Governmental Forum

References

|-

|-

|-

|-

|-

|-

1942 births
Living people
Politicians from Lansing, Michigan
University of Iowa alumni
Illinois lawyers
Speakers of the Illinois House of Representatives
Republican Party members of the Illinois House of Representatives
Elmhurst College faculty
20th-century American politicians
21st-century American politicians